Woughton on the Green (parish) may refer to:

 Old Woughton, a civil parish formed from the division in 2012 of the historic Woughton on the Green CP
 Woughton on the Green, a village in Old Woughton CP
 Woughton (parish), a civil parish formed from the division in 2012 of the historic Woughton on the Green CP